This is a List of State Police Minimum Age Requirements in the United States.

Many states have established, by state statute and/or constitutional provisions, minimum age requirements for the primary law enforcement agency of the state.

18 years old  
Rhode Island

Wisconsin

Louisiana

Montana

Arkansas

19 years old 
Florida

19 1/2 for Trooper Cadet, 21 years old for Trooper 
Washington

20 years old 
California Illinois
Maryland
Vermont

21 years old 
Alabama
Alaska
Arkansas
Idaho
Indiana
Kansas
Kentucky
Massachusetts
Minnesota
Mississippi
Nevada
New Hampshire
New Jersey
New York
North Carolina
Oklahoma
Oregon
South Carolina
Tennessee
Utah
West Virginia Maryland

21, 20 with 60 College Credits
Maine

20, 21 at graduation 
Arizona
Hawai’i
Colorado
Connecticut
Delaware
Georgia
Michigan
Missouri
Nebraska
New Mexico
North Dakota
Ohio
Pennsylvania
South Dakota
Texas
Virginia

21, 22 at graduation 
Iowa
Wyoming

References 

Law enforcement in the United States